Marcon is a comune in the province of Venice, in the Veneto region of northern Italy.

Marcon may also refer to: 
Marcon (surname), a list of people surnamed Marcon
Marcon Bezzina (born 1985), a Maltese judoka
Marcon (convention), a full-spectrum fantasy and science fiction convention based in Columbus, Ohio
Marçon, a commune in the Sarthe department in the region of Pays-de-la-Loire in north-western France

See also
Macron (disambiguation)
MarsCon (disambiguation), two separate, unaffiliated science fiction conventions